Kacper Woryna (born 31 August 1996) is a Polish Speedway rider.

Biography
Born in Rybnik Woryna began racing in his native Poland in the Ekstraliga, with hometown club Rybnik. After a few years of riding in Poland, Woryna got his first break into British Speedway riding with the Coventry Bees during the 2016 Elite League season, who beat off competition from his grandfathers former club the Poole Pirates to secure his signature. Woryna was recommended to the Bees management by club captain and Speedway Grand Prix rider Chris Harris, and was also given a big thumbs up by another of his new Coventry teammates, former world number 2 Krzysztof Kasprzak.

The following season he joined Poole and helped the team win the SGB Premiership 2018.

In 2022, he helped Smederna win the Swedish Speedway Team Championship during the 2022 campaign.

Family
Woryna comes from a racing family. His late grandfather Antoni Woryna rode for the Poole Pirates in the UK and came 3rd in the Speedway World Championship on two occasions, first in 1966 and later in 1970.

Major results

World individual Championship
2016 Speedway Grand Prix - 30th (1 pt)
2022 Speedway Grand Prix - 19th (8 pts)

References

1996 births
Living people
Polish speedway riders
Coventry Bees riders
People from Rybnik